List of Honorary Fellows of Wolfson College, Oxford.

 Sir Edward Abraham
 Thomas Bingham, Baron Bingham of Cornhill
 Sir James Black
 William Bradshaw, Baron Bradshaw
 Alan Bullock, Baron Bullock
 Sir Arnold Burgen
 Sir Anthony Caro
 Sir Michael Epstein
 Hir Henry Fisher
 Robert Goff, Baron Goff of Chieveley
 Andrew D. Hamilton
 Sir Raymond Hoffenberg
 Nasser Khalili
 Raymond Klibansky
 Denis Mack Smith
 Naomi Mitchison
 Sir Arthur Norrington
 Francisco Rezek
 Sir Folliott Sandford
 Erich Segal
 Sir David Smith
 Richard Sorabji
 Richard Wilberforce, Baron Wilberforce
 Leonard Wolfson, Baron Wolfson
 Martin Wood

See also 

 :Category:Alumni of Wolfson College, Oxford
 :Category:Fellows of Wolfson College, Oxford

Fellows of Wolfson College, Oxford
Wolfson